Pataula Creek is a stream in Clay, Quitman,
Randolph and Stewart counties in the U.S. state of Georgia. It empties into Walter F. George Lake on the Chattahoochee River.

Pataula is a name most likely derived from the Muskogean language meaning "flat". Variant names are "Petaula Creek" and "Petewlah Creek".

References

Rivers of Georgia (U.S. state)
Rivers of Clay County, Georgia
Rivers of Quitman County, Georgia
Rivers of Randolph County, Georgia
Rivers of Stewart County, Georgia